Orcel is a surname. Notable people with the surname include: 

Andrea Orcel (born 1963), Italian investment banker 
Bernard Orcel (born 1945), French skier
Claire Orcel (born 1997), French and Belgian high jumper
Jean Orcel (1896–1978), French mineralogist
Michel Orcel (born 1952), French writer, publisher, and psychoanalyst